Bushehr University of Medical Sciences (BPUMS) (Danushgah-e 'lum Pezeshki-ye Bushiher), is a public medical school in Bushehr Province, Iran. BPUMS is one of the oldest and largest universities in Iran. Bushehr University of Medical Sciences administers all public hospitals in and around the city of Bushehr.

History 
Bushehr University of Medical Sciences was founded in 1983 under the name Narjes and started with only 25 students of midwifery. In 1995, after many developments it changed its name to Bushehr University of Medical Sciences by an official permission from the Ministry of Health and Medical Education (Iran). Bushehr University of Medical Sciences trained over 1500 students in 17 different fields of medical sciences. It offers health service to people of its province. Medicine, Dentistry, Social Medicine, Microbiology, Nursing, Midwifery, Nutrition Science, Environmental Health, Public Health, Library science, operating room technology, Anesthesia and Emergency medical technology are the majors which given by Bushehr University of Medical Sciences.

Journal 
Iranian South Medical Journal (ISMJ)

See also
Healthcare in Iran
Iranian South Medical Journal
Higher Education in Iran
List of hospitals in Iran

References

External links
Official website
Official persian website

Medical schools in Iran
Universities in Iran
Education in Bushehr Province
Buildings and structures in Bushehr Province
1983 establishments in Iran
Educational institutions established in 1983